Federico Kleger (9 January 1903 – 5 January 1952) was an Argentine athlete. He competed in the men's hammer throw at the 1928 Summer Olympics and the 1932 Summer Olympics.

References

1903 births
1952 deaths
Naturalized citizens of Argentina
Athletes (track and field) at the 1928 Summer Olympics
Athletes (track and field) at the 1932 Summer Olympics
Argentine male hammer throwers
Olympic athletes of Argentina